Sukhbir Singh Badal (born 9 July 1962) is an Indian politician and the president of Shiromani Akali Dal, and is currently a member of Parliament from the Firozpur. He served as Deputy Chief Minister of Punjab from 2009 to 2017. He is the son of Parkash Singh Badal, who has served several times as Chief Minister of Punjab. Badal and his family have ownership stakes in an array of businesses.

Early life and education
Sukhbir Badal was born on 9 July 1962 in Dhillon jatt family at Faridkot. His mother's name is Surinder Kaur. Initially, he was educated at The Lawrence School, Sanawar. He completed an M.A. Hons. School in Economics from Panjab University Chandigarh from 1980 to 1984 and an M.B.A. from California State University, Los Angeles.

Political career
Sukhbir Singh Badal was a member of the 11th and 12th Lok Sabha, representing Faridkot. He was Union Minister of State for Industry in Second Vajpayee Ministry during 1998 to 1999. He was also a member of Rajya Sabha during 2001 to 2004. In 2004, he was re-elected from Faridkot for 14th Lok Sabha. He became the President of Akali Dal in January 2008. A year later in January 2009, he was sworn in as the Deputy Chief Minister of Punjab. He was not the Member of Punjab Vidhan Sabha at that time. He resigned in July 2009, upon the completion of six-month period available for contesting elections for the assembly, during which he didn't contest any elections. He was again appointed Deputy Chief Minister in August 2009 after winning by-elections from Jalalabad Assembly constituency.

2012 Punjab elections
Akali Dal-BJP combined secured victory in the 2012 Punjab elections, beating anti-incumbency for the first time in Punjab. Sukhbir was re-elected from Jalalabad and remained Deputy Chief Minister. In the new government he held portfolio of Home, Governance Reforms, Housing, Excise and Taxation, Investment Promotion, Sports and Youth Services Welfare and Civil Aviation. This victory and later victory in Delhi Sikh Gurdwara Management Committee elections in January 2013 elevated the position of Sukhbir Singh Badal as an important leader in politics.

Badal defeated Bhagwant Mann of Aam Aadmi Party (MP Sangrur) and Ravneet Singh Bittu (MP Ludhiana) from INC in 2017 Assembly Elections. SAD and BJP alliance lost the majority to Congress. In 2019, he was elected as Member Parliament of Ferozpur Lok Sabha Constituency by defeating Sher Singh Ghubaya of INC by securing more than 600,000 votes on 23 May 2019.

Moga molestation case 
In April 2015, a teenage girl died and her mother was seriously injured when they were molested and thrown from a running bus near Gil village in Moga district. The bus was operated by Orbit Aviation, a company in which Badal has stake.

Subsequently, it was revealed by news reports that the Chief Minister of Punjab gave the girl's father  million in compensation.

2022 Punjab Assembly election
Badal was the president of Akali Dal during the 2022 Punjab Legislative Assembly election. Badal contested from the Jalalabad Assembly constituency and lost the election to Jagdeep Kamboj Goldy of Aam Aadmi Party. Badal lost by a margin of 30,374 Votes. SAD BSP alliance contested in all 117 seats, and won 3 seats. SAD finished on third spot behind AAP and INC.

Business career and allegations 
Badal and his family have direct or indirect interests in any array of businesses. He has been accused of running the state like a "private limited company". Badal holds a majority stake in the Punjabi language PTC television network. Badal and his family are also major stakeholders in Orbit Aviation, Dabwali Transport, Indo-Canadian Transport Company, Metro Eco Green Resorts, Saanjh Foundation, Falcon Properties, and Orbit Resorts. He has been accused of enriching private transport companies, which he has a stake in, while the state transport department has deteriorated. The Oberoi Sukhvilas Spa Resort in New Chandigarh is owned by and named after Sukhbir Badal.

Opinion

Opinion polls and exit polls
In March 2022, Badal said that the opinion polls and exit polls should be banned in India. He claimed that the political parties get the opinion polls done after paying money. He was speaking after most of the Exit poll agencies predicted unanimously that the Aam Aadmi Party will win with a large majority in the 2022 Punjab Legislative Assembly election.

Personal life
He married Harsimrat Kaur Badal on 21 November 1991. She is also a politician and presently Member of Parliament of India from Bathinda Lok Sabha constituency since 2009 and was the union food processing minister under Prime Minister Narendra Modi until 17 May 2020. His mother Surinder Kaur died on 24 May 2011 from throat and pancreatic cancer at PGIMER, Chandigarh. His son Anantbir Singh Badal made his first political appearance in 2019 before Indian general election.

See also
 Bathinda
 Sarup Chand Singla

References

External links

1962 births
Living people
People from Faridkot, Punjab
Punjabi people
Shiromani Akali Dal politicians
State cabinet ministers of Punjab, India
Deputy chief ministers of Punjab, India
Rajya Sabha members from Punjab, India
India MPs 1996–1997
India MPs 1998–1999
India MPs 2004–2009
India MPs 2019–present
Punjab, India MLAs 2007–2012
Punjab, India MLAs 2012–2017
Indian Sikhs
California State University, Los Angeles alumni
Panjab University alumni
Lawrence School, Sanawar alumni
Lok Sabha members from Punjab, India
People from Sri Muktsar Sahib
Punjab, India MLAs 2017–2022
Home Ministers of Punjab, India